Brenda Rose Cowling (23 April 1925 – 2 October 2010) was an English actress from London. Cowling wanted to be a film actress from the time she was a child; however, upon leaving school, she trained instead as a shorthand typist.

Biography 
After a time she joined the Royal Academy of Dramatic Art, where she was a member of the same class as Warren Mitchell and Jimmy Perry. While there, she made her film debut in a small role in Alfred Hitchcock's Stage Fright (1950).

Much of her early acting work was in repertory, before she began her television career. She also appeared in films, such as The Railway Children (1970), Please Sir! (1971), Carry On Girls (1973), Carry On Behind (1975). International Velvet (1978), Oliver Twist (1982) and Octopussy (1983). Television serials in which she appeared include Follyfoot, Miss Marple in They Do It With Mirrors as Mrs Rodgers in 1991, Fawlty Towers as a nurse in "The Germans", Only When I Laugh as the matron nurse in "Last Tango" in 1980, Are You Being Served? as a customer in "The Erotic Dreams of Mrs Slocombe", The Bill (1989), Jonathan Creek, Gorgons Wood as Mrs Thrimpson (2004), Dad's Army as Mrs Prentice in "All is Safely Gathered In", It Ain't Half Hot Mum in "The Last Roll Call" as the WVS Lady, The Famous Five, three episodes of Hi-De-Hi, as a VoiceOver role as a station announcer in "Together Again", a camper in "Raffles", and a maid in "Wedding Bells", and The Legacy of Reginald Perrin. One of her better known roles was as the cook, Mrs. Lipton, in You Rang, M'Lord?.

Later life and death
Cowling retired in 2006 after suffering a stroke. She died on 2 October 2010, at the actors' retirement home, Denville Hall, aged 85.

Selected filmography
Stage Fright (1950) – Plump RADA Girl (uncredited)
The Silken Affair (1956) – Minor Role (uncredited)
Bindle (One of Them Days) (1966) – Martha Hearty
Up in the Air (1969) – Lady Pennyweight
The Railway Children (1970) – Mrs. Viney
Please Sir! (1971) – Mrs. Duffy
Young Winston (1972) – Mrs. Dewsnap (uncredited)
Carry On Girls (1973) – Matron
The Black Windmill (1974) – Pleasant Secretary (uncredited)
Carry On Behind (1975) – Wife (uncredited)
Jabberwocky (1977) – Mrs. Fishfinger
The Black Panther (1977)
International Velvet (1978) – Alice
Oliver Twist (1982) – Mrs. Bedwin
Pink Floyd – The Wall (1982) – Teacher
Octopussy (1983) – Schatzi
Dream Lover (1986) – Hotel Manager
Greenfingers (2000) – Book Shop Customer
Room to Rent (2000) – Church Lady

References

External links
 

1925 births
2010 deaths
English film actresses
English television actresses
Alumni of RADA
Actresses from London
People from Islington (district)
20th-century English actresses
21st-century English actresses
20th-century British businesspeople